Induna.com is an Indian e-retail or e-commerce platform headquartered in Kolkata, India launched on 21 October 2007 by Agarwal brothers, Aadarsh and Siddhant. An online shop for Indian film DVDs, VCDs and audio CDs, it became the top three clicked websites of Kolkatta in its launch year as per the Google Zeitgeist 2008 report. In 2009, the company added the Blu-ray format as well, for regional language films along with Bollywood and Bengali film titles, as well as a collection of Swedish films directed by Ingmar Bergman.

Founders
Brothers Aadarsh Agarwal and Siddhant Agarwal, both commerce graduates from Kolkata University, decided to launch their own online company as they experienced the dismal state of many online stores when they ordered movies.

See also
 E-commerce in India
 Online shopping

References

External links
 

Companies based in Kolkata
Indian companies established in 2007
Internet properties established in 2007
Online retailers of India
Privately held companies of India
2007 establishments in West Bengal